Neistin is a Faroese handball club in Tórshavn, which was founded on 21 March 1931. Neistin has many different teams for men and women, boys and girls. They have teams in the men's best division, FTZ deildin. Neistin has also a team in the women's best division, Hvonn deildin. In April 2011 both men and women won the best divisions in Faroese handball and became Faroese champions. It was the first time in 33 years that both teams of Neistin won the Faroese championship.

Faroe Islands Handball Cup - Steypakappingin 
The Faroe Islands Handball Cup (Steypakappingin) has been arranged in the Faroe Islands since 1985 for the men and 1987 for the women. Neistin has won this competition several times.

Neistin women 
The women's team of Neistin has won the Faroe Islands Handball Cup 12 times: 1987, 1988, 1989, 1990, 1992, 1994, 1995, 1996, 1997, 1998, 2006 and 2012.

Neistin men 
The men's team of Neistin has won the Faroe Islands Handball Cup 6 times: 1992, 1994, 2009, 2010, 2011 and 2012.

The Faroese Championship in Handball

Neistin women in the Faroese Championship 
The women's team of Neistin has won the Faroese Championship in handball 38 times: 1943, 1946, 1948, 1952,  1953, 1954, 1955, 1956, 1957, 1959, 1966, 1967, 1969, 1970, 1971, 1972, 1973, 1974, 1975, 1978, 1979, 1980,  1982,  1983,  1984,  1985,  1986,  1987,  1988,  1989,  1990,  1992, 1994, 1995, 1996, 1997, 2011 and 2012.

Neistin men in the Faroese Championship 
The men's team of Neistin has won the Faroese Championship in handball 8 times: 1949, 1953, 1955, 1978, 2000, 2008, 2010 and 2011.

European record

Women's team

Board Members 

The current board members of Neistin (2018):
- Súna Mørk
- Barbara Høj
- Kristianna Mohr
- Elsa Reinert
- Sylvia Berg Johansen
- Marin Augustinussen
- Andrea Heindriksdóttir

Coaches of Neistin 2018 -19 
Coaches of SMS deildin (The Women's Premier League):
 Kári Horn
 Flemming Raben
 Eirikur Magnussen

Coaches of Okkara deildin (The Men's Premier League):
 Tróndur Kragesteen
 David Edvardsen
 Guðrun Patursson

The Founders of Neistin 
Neistin was founded on 21 March 1931 by these women:
 Petra Rein
 Jenny Rein
 Edil Djurhuus
 Helge Michelsen
 Andreas Mouritsen
 Hanna Mouritsen
 Borghild Evensen
 Anna á Lag
 Sanna á Lag

References 

 Neistin 50 ár. From the Faroese magazine: Myndablaðið NÚ, nr. 1, 1981.

External links 

Neistin.fo

Faroese handball clubs
Sport in Tórshavn